Vladimir Teodorovich Spivakov (Russian: Влади́мир Теодо́рович Спивако́в; born 12 September 1944) is a Soviet and Russian conductor and violinist best known for his work with the Moscow Virtuosi chamber orchestra.

Spivakov was born in Ufa. He studied at the Moscow Conservatory. Spivakov is also considered one of the foremost violinists of his generation, having studied with Yuri Yankelevich at the Moscow Conservatory. 

Spivakov currently serves as the Artistic Director and Principal Conductor of the National Philharmonic of Russia. He conducted the music for Garri Bardin's 2010 animated feature, The Ugly Duckling.

In March 2014 he signed a letter in support of Vladimir Putin's policies regarding the 2014 Russian annexation of Crimea and Ukraine. However, in 2022, he and other Russian artists signed a letter against the Russian invasion of Ukraine initiated by Putin.

Honours and awards
 Lenin Komsomol Prize (1982) - for high performance skills
 Order of Merit, 2nd class (Ukraine, 2009)
 "Russian of the Year" (May 2005)
 UNESCO Artist for Peace - for his "outstanding contribution to the musician in the art world, his work for peace and dialogue between cultures" (2006)

See also
 List of Russian composers

References

External links 
[Official Website[russian]
Official site of Spivakov Foundation
Official site of Spivakov's orchestra
Biography in English
Another English biography
Spivakov on Classical Archives
Biography in Russian
Spivakov and the National Philharmonic of Russia
A quest for harmony

1944 births
20th-century Russian conductors (music)
20th-century Russian male musicians
20th-century violinists
21st-century Russian conductors (music)
21st-century Russian male musicians
21st-century violinists
Living people
Musicians from Ufa
Moscow Conservatory alumni
Honored Artists of the RSFSR
People's Artists of the RSFSR
People's Artists of the USSR
Recipients of the Lenin Komsomol Prize
Full Cavaliers of the Order "For Merit to the Fatherland"
Recipients of the Order of Merit (Ukraine), 2nd class
Recipients of the title of People's Artists of Ukraine
Recipients of the USSR State Prize
State Prize of the Russian Federation laureates
Long-Thibaud-Crespin Competition prize-winners
Officiers of the Légion d'honneur
Officiers of the Ordre des Arts et des Lettres
Paganini Competition prize-winners
Male violinists
Jewish classical musicians
Russian male conductors (music)
Russian Jews
Russian violinists
Soviet conductors (music)
Soviet violinists
Russian activists against the 2022 Russian invasion of Ukraine